Astro Coast is the debut album by American indie rock band Surfer Blood. It was released January 19, 2010, on Kanine Records.

Astro Coast received very positive reviews. The album peaked at number 124 on the Billboard 200 chart.

Track listing

Personnel
Surfer Blood
 John Paul Pitts – vocals, guitar, string arrangements, engineering, production
 Thomas Fekete – guitar, vocals
 Tyler Schwarz – drums
 Brian Black – bass, vocals

Additional personnel
 Kevin Williams – guitar (track 3)
 Freddy Schwenk Sr. – flute
 Emily Dwyer – strings
 Brenda Hollingsworth – mastering
 Ryan Copt – engineering
 Garth Warner – cover art
 Julia Pitts – cover art
 Jason Rueger – design, layout

Charts

References

Surfer Blood albums
2010 debut albums
Kanine Records albums